Procerapachys is an extinct genus of ants which existed 37 to 42 million years ago. A member of the subfamily Dorylinae of the family Formicidae, Procerapachys was first described by American entomologist William Morton Wheeler in 1915.

References

Dorylinae
Fossil ant genera
Eocene insects
Fossil taxa described in 1915
Fossil taxa described in 2009
†
Eocene genus first appearances
Prehistoric insects of Europe